Makov is a village and municipality in Čadca District in the Žilina Region of northern Slovakia.

History
In historical records the village was first mentioned in 1720.

Geography
The municipality lies at an altitude of 583 metres and covers an area of 46.052 km². It has a population of about 1905 people.

Villages and municipalities in Čadca District